Checkrow is an unincorporated community in Fulton County, Illinois, United States. Checkrow is located south of Illinois Route 9 and east of Bushnell.

It is home to Checkrow Community Church which has been serving the community for over seventy-five years.

References

External links 
Checkrow Community Church

Unincorporated communities in Fulton County, Illinois
Unincorporated communities in Illinois